The Centre for Independent Studies (CIS) is an Australian libertarian think tank founded in 1976 which specialises in public policy research. It is based in Sydney and focuses on classical liberal issues such as free markets and limited government.

The CIS is funded solely by donations, membership subscriptions, and book and event sales from individuals, companies and charitable trusts.  It does not accept government funding. All research decisions are made by the research team and not by the donors.

Philosophy
The CIS describes itself as a "classical liberal think tank."

The CIS measures its performance by monitoring and analysing the output of research papers, events, presentations, opinion pieces and media mentions, changes in the policy environment, website page views and financial support.

CIS is affiliated with the United States-based Atlas Network, which advocates free market economic policies across the world.

Research programs
The CIS has research programs on:
 Education
 Economic policy (tax policy, infrastructure, workplace reform, government spending)
 Culture, prosperity and civil society
 Indigenous affairs
 China and free societies

Most policy research focuses upon the role of the free market in an open society, and how voluntary processes could be used to provide many of the goods and services normally supplied by the compulsory methods of government. Individual liberty and choice, including freedom of association, religion, speech and the right to property are also common themes.

A report dated 2 November 2016 on Australia’s health system by CIS stated “government restrictions, regulations, and other barriers to entry within the health care and medical insurance industries cripple [competition]” and proposed setting up of “Health Innovation Communities”.

A June 2018 CIS report found that the overwhelming majority of Australian “millennials” (defined as those born between 1980 and 1996) have a favourable view of socialism. The report was described as "a worried warning to Australia’s ruling elite of a political radicalisation among young people and the threat that it poses to the capitalist system."

Media
CIS researchers regularly comment in opinion pieces in Australian newspapers, online, on radio and on TV, with content mirrored on their YouTube channel.

The CIS also has a weekly newsletter ideas@thecentre and a weekly livestream interview show On Liberty.

Staff
Tom Switzer has been executive director of CIS since 2018, succeeding founder Greg Lindsay who had held the position for 42 years. In 2019, Nicholas Moore was appointed chairman of the CIS board, succeeding Peter Mason.

Notable individuals in the research staff include Salvatore Babones,  Nyunggai Warren Mundine and Steven Schwartz.

References

External links
 The Centre for Independent Studies
 Liberty and Society Conference

Think tanks based in Australia
Libertarianism in Australia
Political advocacy groups in Australia
Libertarian think tanks
Think tanks established in 1976
1976 establishments in Australia
Political and economic think tanks based in Australia